Austin is a small unincorporated community  within the boundaries of the incorporated town of Orchard City in Delta County, Colorado, United States. There is a U.S. Post Office in Austin, the ZIP Code for which is 81410.

Ferganchick Orchard Rock Art Site, listed on the National Register of Historic Places, is a prehistoric archaeological site located near Austin.  Starting that the beginning of the 1st century, rock art was made at the site by Archaic people, and then Uncompahgre complex and Ute people.

A post office called Austin has been in operation since 1905. The community has the name of Austin E. Miller, an early settler.

Geography
Austin is located at  (38.781253,-107.950974).

See also

Outline of Colorado
Index of Colorado-related articles
State of Colorado
Colorado cities and towns
Colorado municipalities
Colorado counties
Delta County, Colorado
Prehistory of Colorado

References

External links

Unincorporated communities in Delta County, Colorado
Unincorporated communities in Colorado